The Damascus Securities Exchange (DSE) is a stock exchange located in Damascus, Syria. Founded in 2009, it is the only stock exchange in Syria. The Damascus Securities Exchange is a member of the Federation of Euro-Asian Stock Exchanges.

It started with its premises in the Barzeh district. On 10 May 2022 It moved to the business district of Yaafur.

History 
The first official tradings were launched on Tuesday March 10, 2009.

Syrian war

According to the International Monetary Fund (IMF), between March 2011 when the uprising began, and May 2012, the value of the Syrian pound has fallen 45 percent and the Damascus stock exchange decreased 40 percent.

See also
 Economy of Syria
 List of stock exchanges

References

External links
Damascus Securities Exchange Website

Damascus
Stock exchanges in Asia
Economy of Syria
Buildings and structures in Damascus
2009 establishments in Syria